The 2011 LSU Tigers football team represented Louisiana State University in the 2011 NCAA Division I FBS football season. The Tigers were led by seventh-year head coach Les Miles and played their home games at Tiger Stadium. They were a member of the Western Division of the Southeastern Conference. They finished the season 13–1, 8–0 in SEC play to be Western Division champions. They represented the division in the SEC Championship Game where they defeated Eastern Division champion Georgia 42–10 be crowned SEC champions. They finished the season ranked #1 in the final BCS poll to earn a spot in the BCS National Championship Game vs #2 Alabama. The Tigers, who had defeated Alabama 9–6 in the regular season, lost to the Crimson Tide 0–21. It was the first time a team was ever shut out in a BCS game.

Personnel

Roster

Coaching staff

Depth chart

Schedule
Schedule source:

Game summaries

Oregon

This is only the 4th meeting of these two teams. The win expanded LSU's lead in the series to 3-1-0.

Northwestern State

The "series" began in 1911. The win expanded LSU's lead in the series to 11-0-0.

Mississippi State

The series began in 1896 and LSU has played the Bulldogs more often than any other opponent. The win expanded LSU's lead in the series to 69-33-3.

West Virginia

Kentucky

The series began in 1949. The win expanded LSU's lead in the series to 39-16-1.

Florida

The series began in 1937. LSU currently trails in the series, but with the win makes it 25-30-3.

Tennessee

The series began in 1925. LSU currently trails in the series, but with the win makes it 9-20-3.  This was also the largest margin of victory by either team in the series.

Auburn

The series began in 1901. The win expanded LSU's lead in the series to 25-20-1.  This was also the largest margin of victory by either team in the series.

Alabama

The series began in 1895. LSU still trails in the series, but with the win makes it 25-45-5.

Western Kentucky

This was the first meeting between the two teams. At halftime, soccer player Mo Isom was named Homecoming Queen at halftime in Tiger Stadium. Isom was the first athlete in LSU history to be recognized as Homecoming Queen.

Ole Miss

The series began in 1894. In this, the 100th meeting between the two teams, the win extended LSU's lead in the series to 57-39-4.  This was also the largest margin of victory by either team in the series and Mississippi's worst loss at home ever - after a 47-0 loss to Kentucky in 1949.

Arkansas

The series began in 1901. With the win, LSU extends their lead in the series to 35-20-2 as well as winning the SEC West Division and thus their spot in the conference championship game against Georgia. This was the 2nd largest audience in Tiger Stadium history, behind the 2009 game against Florida which featured 93,129 fans.

Georgia (SEC Championship Game)

This series began in 1901. The last time these two teams played, #13 Georgia won over #3 LSU in 2005 34-15. #8 Georgia went on to lose the Sugar Bowl to #13 West Virginia 35-38. With the win in this game, LSU extended their lead in the series to 16-12-1 as well as winning the SEC and thus their spot in the national championship game against Alabama.

Alabama (National Championship Game)

For the first time in the BCS-era, the two teams in the national championship game are from the same conference and division.

Rankings

References

LSU
LSU Tigers football seasons
Southeastern Conference football champion seasons
LSU Tigers football